Ceromitia leptosticta is a moth of the  family Adelidae. It is found in Australia within both the Australian Capital Territory and Queensland.

External links
Australian Faunal Directory
Image at CSIRO Entomology

Moths of Australia
Adelidae
Endemic fauna of Australia
Moths described in 1900